"Too Much Passion" is a song by the American alternative rock group The Smithereens. It is the second single released in support of their fourth album Blow Up.

It hit #8 on the Cash Box Top 100 (dated April 18, 1992) as well as #37 on the Billboard Hot 100 chart. It also provided Smithereens with their first, and to date, only Adult Contemporary charting song, reaching #32 on that chart.

In the Smithereens guitar book, Pat DiNizio explains that he wrote the song to sound like the style of Smokey Robinson. There was also a music video directed by Jeff Stein (known for his work on The Kids Are Alright).

Formats and track listing 
All songs written by Pat DiNizio, except where noted.
US cassette single (4KM-44784)
"Too Much Passion" – 4:35
"If You Want the Sun to Shine (instrumental version)" – 5:56

US CD single (C2-15818)
"Too Much Passion" – 4:35
"World Keeps Going Round" – 2:40
"It Don't Come Easy" – 3:07
"If You Want the Sun to Shine (instrumental version)" – 5:56

Charts

References

External links 
 

1991 songs
1991 singles
Capitol Records singles
The Smithereens songs
Song recordings produced by Ed Stasium
Songs written by Pat DiNizio